Vidas Alunderis (born 27 March 1979 in Klaipėda, Lithuanian SSR, Soviet Union) is a Lithuanian footballer who is currently unattached. Vidas is a defender who can play in the centre or on the right side.

External links 
 Vidas Alunderis profile – 90minut.pl

1979 births
Living people
Lithuanian footballers
Lithuanian expatriate footballers
Lithuania international footballers
Zagłębie Lubin players
FC Metalist Kharkiv players
SC Tavriya Simferopol players
LASK players
A Lyga players
Ukrainian Premier League players
Austrian Football Bundesliga players
Ekstraklasa players
Expatriate footballers in Ukraine
Lithuanian expatriate sportspeople in Ukraine
Lithuanian expatriate sportspeople in Poland
FC Baltika Kaliningrad players
Expatriate footballers in Russia
Expatriate footballers in Poland
Expatriate footballers in Austria
Sportspeople from Klaipėda
FC Sibir Novosibirsk players
Association football defenders